Tadeusz Jan Kowalski (1889-1948) was a Polish orientalist, expert on Middle East Muslim culture and languages. He was a professor at Jagiellonian University, and a member of the Polish Academy of Learning.

Published works

Books 
Ze studiów nad formą poezji ludów tureckich (1921)
Arabowie i Turcy w świetle źródeł (1923)
Turcja powojenna (1925)
W sprawie zapożyczeń tureckich w języku polskim (1928)
Karaimische Texte im Dialekt von Troki (1929)
Próba charakterystyki twórczosci arabskiej (1933)
Na szlakach islamu (1935)
Zagadnienie liczby mnogiej w językach tureckich (1936)
Próba charakterystyki ludów tureckich (1946)
Studia nad "Shah-name" (1952-1953, 2 v.)

Correspondence 
  Dziurzyńska, E., et al. (Ed.), Korespondencja Tadeusza Kowalskiego z Janem Rypką i Bedřichem Hroznym, Kraków, 2007.

References

Sources
Biogramy uczonych polskich, Część I: Nauki społeczne, zeszyt 2: K-O (pod redakcją Andrzeja Śródki i Pawła Szczawińskiego), Ossolineum, Wrocław 1984.
Majkowska, R. (red.): Tadeusz Kowalski 1889-1948. Materiały z posiedzenia naukowego PAU w dniu 19 czerwca 1998 r., Kraków 1999.
Stachowski, M.: "Kowalski, Caferoğlu und die Universität Stambul". – Türk Dilleri Araştιrmalarι 8 (Istanbul 1998): 211–228.

1889 births
1948 deaths
Polish orientalists
Academic staff of Jagiellonian University